Ibrāhīm al-Kōnī (sometimes translated as Ibrāhīm Kūnī) is a Libyan writer and is considered to be one of the most prolific Arab novelists.

Biography 
Born in 1948 in the Fezzan Region, Ghadamis City, Ibrahim Kuni was brought up on the tradition of the Tuareg, popularly known as "the veiled men" or "the blue men." Mythological elements, spiritual quest and existential questions mingle in the writings of Kuni who has been hailed as magical realist, Sufi fabulist and poetic novelist.

He spent his childhood in the desert and learned to read and write Arabic when he was twelve. Kuni studied literature and journalism at the Maxim Gorky Literature Institute in Moscow and worked as a journalist in Moscow and Warsaw. He moved to Switzerland in 1993 and was living there as of 2011.

Works 
By 2007, Kuni had published more than 80 books and received numerous awards. His books have been translated from their original Arabic into 35 languages. His novel Gold Dust appeared in English in 2008. In 2015, Kuni was shortlisted for the Man Booker International Prize.

Bibliography 
 Ibrahim Kuni, Anubis: A Desert Novel. Translated by William M. Hutchins
 Ibrahim Kuni, Gold Dust. Translated by Elliott Colla. London: Arabia Books, 2008. 
 Ibrahim Kuni, The Animists. Translated by Elliott Colla.
 Ibrahim Kuni, The Bleeding of the Stone. Translated by May Jayyusi and Christopher Tingley.
 Ibrahim Kuni, The Puppet. Translated by William M. Hutchins.
 Ibrahim Kuni, The Seven Veils of Seth. Translated by William M. Hutchins. Reading, UK: Garnet Publishing, 2008. 
 Meinrad Calleja, "The Philosophy of Desert Metaphors in Ibrahim al-Koni - The Bleeding of the Stone', 2013, Faraxa Publishers

See also 
 The Bleeding of the Stone
 Gold Dust (novel)

External links
 "A Celebration of Ibrahim al-Koni, the Desert, Russian Literature, and 'Swiss Sufism'" from the blog Arabic Literature (in English)
 Rawafed: Documentary Interview with Ibrahim Kuni. Alarabiya.net
 "Academic: The Philosophy of Desert Metaphors in Ibrahim al-Koni - The Bleeding of the Stone" from the blog Commentary/Information on Books of FARAXA Publishing House

References

1948 births
Arabic-language novelists
Berber writers
Fabulists
Libyan journalists
Libyan novelists
Living people
Tuareg people
Male journalists
Male novelists
Libyan male writers
20th-century novelists
21st-century novelists
People from Fezzan
20th-century male writers
21st-century male writers
20th-century Libyan writers
21st-century Libyan writers